Romeo Nicolas Sarmenta Tejedor (born April 28, 1972 in Quezon City, Philippines), known professionally as Romnick Sarmenta, is a Filipino actor best remembered as the five-year-old boy who played the role of Peping in the TV series Gulong ng Palad.

Biography
Romnick Sarmenta was born to Adonis F. Tejedor and Julie C. Sarmenta. He started acting at the age of four. He later joined the youth-oriented variety show That's Entertainment, where he was paired with Jennifer Sevilla and eventually with Sheryl Cruz which became a hit love team during the 1980s. He has appeared in more than 60 films and TV shows. In 1999, he won a Best Actor Award from the Asian Television Awards for his performance in the GMA telemovie Bakla.

He was one of the stars of GMA Network who starred in top-rating shows such as Bakekang, Now and Forever and Impostora.

He was also included in GMA's 2010 offering First Time, playing a father to Baste - a boy caught in a love triangle between himself, Cindy and Lucas.

Personal life
Sarmenta is previously married to actress Harlene Bautista. They have five children. Now he is married to Barbara Ruaro and they have 1 child together.

He is an avid cyclist.
He is an active member of Elim, a Catholic Christian community, where he serves and is actively involved in missionary works of the community.

Filmography

Film
Pinagbuklod ng Pag-ibig (1978)
The Jess Lapid Story (1978)
Batang Salabusab (1979)
Bira, Darna, Bira! (1979) (as Romnick) - Ding
Kung Tawagin Siya'y Bathala (1980)
Diablo Sagrado (1980)
Lukso ng Dugo (1981)
My Darling Princess (1983) - Michael
Pieta, Ikalawang Aklat (1984)  - Young Noel
Condemned (1984)
Halimaw sa Banga (1986)
Takot Ako, Eh! (1987) - Romeo
Tatlong Ina, Isang Anak (1987)
Huwag Mong Buhayin ang Bangkay (1987) - Roy
Leroy Leroy Sinta (1988)
Rock-a-Bye Baby: Tatlo Ang Daddy (1988) - Joey
Puso sa Puso (1988) - Daniel
Guhit ng Palad (1988)
Langit at Lupa (1988)
One Two Bato, Three Four Bapor (1988)
Pardina at ang Mga Duwende (1989) - Dino
Everlasting Love (1989) - Ricardo
First Lesson (1989)
Sagot ng Puso (1990) - Mando
Mundo Man Ay Magunaw (1990) - Archie
Beautiful Girl (1990)
Naughty Boys (1990)
Kapag Nag-abot ang Langit at Lupa (1991)
Ubos Na ang Luha Ko (1991)
Kung Tayo'y Magkakalayo (1991)
Tukso Layuan Mo Ako (1991) - Daniel
Takbo... Talon... Tili!!! (1992)
Sa Aking Puso: The Marcos 'Bong' Manalang Story (1992) - Bong Manalang
Sonny Boy, Public Enemy Number 1 of Cebu City (1992) - Sonny Boy
Alyas Stella Magtanggol (1992)
Eh, Kasi Bata (1992)
Lumuhod Ka sa Lupa (1993)
Mario Sandoval (1993)
Ging Gang Goody Giddiyap (1994) - Bong
Bawal Na Gamot (1994)
Johnny Tinoso and the Proud Beauty (1994)
Bawal Na Gamot 2 (1995)
Ka Hector (1995)
Kahit Harangan ng Bala (1995) - Bobbit Zaragosa
The Bocaue Pagoda Tragedy (1995)
Sariwa (1996) - Luisito
Tirad Pass: The Last Stand of Gen. Gregorio del Pilar  (1996) - Gregorio del Pilar
Damong Ligaw (1997) - Florante
Ang Pulubi at ang Prinsesa (1997) - Baldo
Miguel/Michelle (1998) - Miguel/Michelle de la Cruz
Berdugo (1998) - Joselito
Umaaraw, Umuulan (2006)
Prinsesa by Law (2008)
Hustisya (2014)
Kung Paano Hinihintay Ang Dapithapon (2018)
Clarita (2019)
Yours Truly, Shirley (2019)
Write About Love (2019)

Television/Digital

References

External links

1972 births
Living people
ABS-CBN personalities
Filipino male child actors
Filipino male film actors
Filipino male television actors
GMA Network personalities
Male actors from Metro Manila
People from Quezon City
That's Entertainment (Philippine TV series)
That's Entertainment Wednesday Group Members